Peter Penz (born 5 April 1984 in Hall in Tirol) is an Austrian former luger who competed between 2003 and 2018. He and doubles partner Georg Fischler took two medals at the 2018 Winter Olympics in Pyongchang: a silver in the doubles competition and a bronze in the team relay. They were also gold medallists in the doubles at the 2012 European Luge Championships in Paramonovo. In addition the pair took six medals at the FIL World Luge Championships: four in the doubles and two in mixed team competitions.

He won two medals in the mixed team event at the FIL World Luge Championships with a silver in 2009 and a bronze in 2007. He also finished fifth in the men's doubles event at the 2008 championships in Oberhof, Germany. Penz also finished sixth in the men's doubles event at the 2008 FIL European Luge Championships in Cesana, Italy.

In August 2018 Penz and Fischler announced their retirement from competition, in part due to Penz suffering from back pain. He confirmed that he would remain in the sport as a coach with the Austrian Luge Federation. The pair made their last competitive appearance at the 2018–19 Luge World Cup's opening round at Igls in November 2018.

References

 FIL-Luge profile

External links
 
 
 

1984 births
Living people
Austrian male lugers
Austrian sports coaches
Olympic lugers of Austria
Olympic silver medalists for Austria
Olympic bronze medalists for Austria
Olympic medalists in luge
Lugers at the 2014 Winter Olympics
Lugers at the 2018 Winter Olympics
Medalists at the 2018 Winter Olympics
People from Hall in Tirol
Sportspeople from Tyrol (state)